Little Caney Township is a township in Chautauqua County, Kansas, USA.  As of the 2000 census, its population was 353.

Geography
According to the USGS, it contains five cemeteries: Elcado, Fairview, Haynes, Ireland and Mooney.

Niotaze Lake is within this township. The streams of Birch Creek, Lake Creek and Little Caney River run through this township.

References
 USGS Geographic Names Information System (GNIS)

External links
 US-Counties.com
 City-Data.com

Townships in Chautauqua County, Kansas
Townships in Kansas